Dr. Mohamed Kamel Leilah was an Egyptian law professor, who served as the speaker of the Egyptian People's Assembly from 5 November 1983 to 22 June 1984.

References

Possibly living people
20th-century Egyptian lawyers
Egyptian academics
Members of the House of Representatives (Egypt)
Higher education ministers of Egypt